Jeanne Hines ( July 29, 1922 in West Virginia - August 23, 2014) was an American writer of gothic novels using her real name and romance novels as Valerie Sherwood and Rosamond Royal.

Biography
Jeanne Hines was born in Moorefield, West Virginia, the daughter of Llewellyn Brown McNeill and Bess Heiskell McNeil. She grew up in a traditional family, but dreamed of doing something more than marrying and becoming a housewife. She married in 1943 Edward Thomas Hines (March 2, 1914 - Dec. 8, 2001) and moved to Charlotte, North Carolina, but she was writing while she traveled with her husband between their five mansions along the East Coast.

She worked as a reporter and fashion magazine illustrator before turning to fiction and becoming a novelist. Published since 1973, she penned gothic novels under her real name and romance novels as Valerie Sherwood and Rosamond Royal until 1991. She won the Romantic Times 1987-1988 Career Achievement Award in the category of "historical adventure".

When author Chris Marie Green (aka Crystal Green), was 19, she wrote a fan letter to Hines, and the historical author answered the gushing missive and inspired her to write her first romance.

Bibliography

As Jeanne Hines

Single novels
The Slashed Portrait, 1973
Tidehawks,	1974
Talons of the Hawk, 1975
Bride of Terror, 1976
Scarecrow House, 1976
The Legend of Witchwynd, 1976
The Keys to Queenscourt, 1976
The Third Wife, 1977

As Valerie Sherwood

Single novels
This Loving Torment, August 1977
These Golden Pleasures, November 1977
Lovely Lying Lips,	December 1983
Born to Love, June 1984
To Love a Rogue, October 1987
Her Crowning Glory, 1988
Lisbon, September 1989

Angel Series
This Towering Passion, November 1978
Her Shining Splendor, July 1980
The Mistress, 1991

Love Series
Bold Breathless Love, August 1981
Rash Reckless love, June 1982
Wild Willful Love, October 1982
Rich Radiant Love, June 1983

Song Series
Lovesong, September 1985
Windsong, March 1986
Nightsong, September 1986

As Rosamond Royal
Rapture, 1979

References and sources

1922 births
2014 deaths
20th-century American novelists
20th-century American women writers
American romantic fiction writers
People from Moorefield, West Virginia
Novelists from West Virginia
American women novelists
Women romantic fiction writers
Writers from Charlotte, North Carolina
Novelists from North Carolina
21st-century American women